Peter Sloss is a Scottish meteorologist and broadcaster currently working for BBC Scotland.  Sloss has worked for the BBC Weather Centre and occasionally presents the weather on Reporting Scotland and on BBC Radio Scotland's news programmes.

References

Living people
Year of birth missing (living people)
English meteorologists
Place of birth missing (living people)